Prionia is an Aromanian (Vlach) village and a community of the Grevena municipality, Greece. Before the 2011 local government reform it was a part of the municipality of Gorgiani. The 2011 census recorded 64 residents in the village. Prionia is a part of the community of Kallithea.

See also
List of settlements in the Grevena regional unit

References

Populated places in Grevena (regional unit)
Aromanian settlements in Greece